The Tsogo languages are a clade of Bantu languages coded Zone B.30 in Guthrie's classification. According to Nurse & Philippson (2003), the languages form a valid node. They are:
 Tsogo (Getsogo), Himba (Simba), Pinzi, Vove, Kande
Nurse & Philippson also include (B.10) Myene, following Piron (1997), who makes Tsogo and Myene together a divergent branch of Bantu. Maho adds Viya (Eviya) and Bongwe.

References